The following is a timeline of the history of the city of Burgos, Spain.

Prior to 20th century

 884 - Castle of Burgos founded by Diego Rodríguez Porcelos, the second Count of Castile.
 1074 - El Cid marries Jimena Díaz.
 1099 - Castilian military leader El Cid buried in Burgos Cathedral.
 1187 - Abbey of Santa María la Real de Las Huelgas founded.
 1221 - Burgos Cathedral construction begins.
 1224 -  founded (approximate date).
 1254 - Edward I of England marries Eleanor of Castile.
 1301 - .
 1302 - .
 1308 - .
 1315 - .
 1350 - San Esteban church built.
 1390 - Public clock installed (approximate date).
 1408 - San Nicolás de Bari built.
 1475 - Siege of Burgos (1475) at the Castle of Burgos, part of the War of the Castilian Succession.
 1484 - Miraflores Charterhouse rebuilt near Burgos.
 1485 - Printing press in use.(es)
 1494 - Consulado established.
 1505 - San Nicolás de Bari church built.
 1522 - Rebellion against Charles V. crushed. 
 1545 -  built.
 1560 - The Court removed to Madrid.
 1562 - Arco de Santa María built.
 1567 - Burgos Cathedral construction completed.
 1574 - Roman Catholic diocese of Burgos established.
 1808 - 10 November: Battle of Burgos; French win.
 1812 - Siege of Burgos by Anglo-Portuguese Army during the Peninsular War.
 1833 - City becomes seat of Province of Burgos.
 1836 -  promenade created.
 1842 - Population: 15,924.
 1857 - Population: 26,086.
 1858 -  (theatre) opens.
 1871 -  (library) opens.
 1878 -  (museum) active.
 1887 - Chamber of Commerce established.
 1891 - Diario de Burgos newspaper begins publication.
 1900 - Population: 30,167.

20th century

 1902 - North train station built.(es)
 1907 -  built.
 1930
 Artificial silk factory begins operating.
 Population: 40,061.
 1936
 24 July: At the start of the Spanish Civil War, nationalists declare a government in the form of the National Defense Council, which meets for the first time in Burgos.
 29 September: Nationalist junta in Burgos declares Franco Generalísimo.
 Burgos becomes capital of the Francoist .(es)
 1944 -  (bus depot) opens.
 1955 -  becomes part of the city of Burgos.
 1964 - Estadio El Plantío (stadium) opens.
 1970
 Burgos trials (Proceso de Burgos) held in Burgos.
 Population: 119,915.
 1971 - Santa María de Garoña Nuclear Power Plant commissioned in region of city of Burgos.
 1979 -  becomes mayor.
 1981 - Population: 156,449.
 1983 - City becomes part of the autonomous community of Castile and León.
 1985 - Burgos Municipal Archives moves into the Palacio de Castilfalé.
 1994
  corruption scandal sentencing decided.
 Burgos CF (football club) formed.
 University of Burgos founded.

21st century

 2007 -  begins operating.
 2008
 Burgos Airport terminal built.
  redesign begins.
 Burgos-Rosa de Lima railway station (train station) built.
 2009 - 29 July: 2009 Burgos bombing by ETA.
 2010 - Museum of Human Evolution opens.
 2011
  becomes mayor.
 Population: 178,864.
 2012 -  built.
 2014 - January: .

See also
 Burgos history
 
 List of bishops of Burgos
 
 Timelines of other cities in the autonomous community of Castile and León: Salamanca, Valladolid

References

This article incorporates information from the Spanish Wikipedia.

Bibliography

in English

in Spanish
 
 
 
  circa 1921

External links

 Items related to Burgos, various dates (via Europeana)
 Items related to Burgos, various dates (via Digital Public Library of America)

Burgos
Burgos